The 2017 Copa Colsanitas (also known as the 2017 Claro Open Colsanitas) was a women's tennis tournament played on outdoor clay courts. It was the 20th edition of the Copa Colsanitas, and part of the International category of the 2017 WTA Tour. It took place at the Centro de Alto Rendimiento in Bogotá, Colombia, from April 10 through April 15, 2017.

Points and prize money

Point distribution

Prize money

Singles main-draw entrants

Seeds 

 1 Rankings as of 3 April 2017.

Other entrants 
The following players received wildcards into the singles main draw:
  Emiliana Arango
  Alyssa Mayo 
  Francesca Schiavone

The following players received entry from the qualifying draw:
  Cindy Burger
  Fiona Ferro
  Beatriz Haddad Maia
  Conny Perrin
  Nadia Podoroska
  Jil Teichmann

Withdrawals 
Before the tournament
 Mandy Minella →replaced by  Grace Min
 Peng Shuai →replaced by  Verónica Cepede Royg
 Anna Tatishvili →replaced by  Sachia Vickery

Doubles main-draw entrants

Seeds 

 Rankings are as of April 3, 2017.

Other entrants 
The following pairs received wildcards into the doubles main draw:
  Beatriz Haddad Maia /  Nadia Podoroska
  Alyssa Mayo /  Stephanie Nemtsova

Champions

Singles 

  Francesca Schiavone def.  Lara Arruabarrena, 6–4, 7–5

Doubles 

  Beatriz Haddad Maia /  Nadia Podoroska def.  Verónica Cepede Royg /  Magda Linette, 6–3, 7–6(7–4)

References

External links 
 

Copa Claro Colsanitas
Copa Colsanitas
Copa Claro Colsanitas